The Provincial Council of Friesland is the provincial council for the Dutch province of Friesland, first introduced under the Constitution of the Netherlands in 1814. It forms the legislative body of the province. Its 43 seats are distributed every four years in provincial elections. Since 2008, it is chaired by John Jorritsma (VVD).

Current composition
Since the 2019 provincial elections, the distribution of seats of the Provincial Council of Friesland has been as follows:

See also
 States of Friesland
 Provincial politics in the Netherlands

References

External links

  

Politics of Friesland
Friesland